Arkadiusz Ossowski (born 4 November 1996) is a Polish handball player for MMTS Kwidzyn and the Polish national team.

References

1996 births
Living people
People from Kwidzyn
Sportspeople from Pomeranian Voivodeship
Polish male handball players
21st-century Polish people